Corinne Maîtrejean (born 8 November 1979 in Tassin-la-Demi-Lune, Rhône) is a French foil fencer who won a bronze medal in the foil team event of the 2005 World Fencing Championships in Leipzig with her teammates Adeline Wuillème, Céline Seigneur and Astrid Guyart. In 2013, she was part of the French team that won team silver in the World Championships, with Anita Blaze, Astrid Guyart and Ysaora Thibus.  She is right-handed. She lives in Aubervilliers.

She competed at the 2008 Olympics in Beijing and at the 2012 Olympics in London as part of France's fencing squad.

References

External links 
 
 
 
 

1979 births
Living people
People from Tassin-la-Demi-Lune
Fencers at the 2008 Summer Olympics
Fencers at the 2012 Summer Olympics
French female foil fencers
Olympic fencers of France
Sportspeople from Lyon Metropolis